1906 Helsinki bank robbery was an armed robbery on 26 February 1906 in Helsinki, Grand Duchy of Finland. A branch of Russian State Bank was robbed by members of the Latvian Social Democratic Workers' Party to fund Bolshevik revolutionary activities in Russia.

The robbery was organized by Russian revolutionary Nikolay Burenin and executed by a gang of 15 Latvian revolutionaries who killed a guard and escaped with 170,743 rubles (equivalent to around US$1.7 million in 2013). Burenin was a concert pianist who was playing in Tampere on the same evening. On their way to meet him, three gang members were captured in the village of Kerava after one Russian gendarme was shot dead. The gang leader Jānis Čoke and three other robbers were able to reach Tampere where they handed the money over to Burenin. He later fled with it to the United States on Maxim Gorki's fund raising trip as his personal secretary.

Jānis Čoke was captured three days later in Tampere. He managed to kill three people including one policeman before he was arrested. Čoke was sentenced to three life sentences plus 19 years. He died of pneumonia in June 1910.

See also 

 1907 Tiflis bank robbery

References 

1906 crimes in Finland
1906 in Finland
Bank robberies
Bolshevik finance
1900s in Helsinki
Robberies in Finland
Crime in Helsinki
February 1906 events